The FIFA Club World Cup is an international association football competition organised by the Fédération Internationale de Football Association (FIFA), the sport's global governing body. The championship was first contested as the FIFA Club World Championship in 2000. It was not held between 2001 and 2004 due to a combination of factors, most importantly the collapse of FIFA's marketing partner International Sport and Leisure. Following a change in format which saw the FIFA Club World Championship absorb the Intercontinental Cup, it was relaunched in 2005 and took its current name the season afterwards.

The current format of the tournament involves seven teams competing for the title at venues within the host nation over a period of about two weeks; the winners of that year's edition of the Asian AFC Champions League, African CAF Champions League, North American CONCACAF Champions League, South American Copa Libertadores, Oceanian OFC Champions League and European UEFA Champions League, along with the host nation's national champion, participate in a straight knockout tournament.

Pep Guardiola was the first manager to win the tournament on three occasions; he led Spanish club Barcelona to success in 2009 and 2011, and coached German side Bayern Munich to victory in 2013. Carlo Ancelotti has also won three titles: once with Milan in 2007, and twice with Real Madrid in 2014 and 2022. Zinedine Zidane (in 2016 and 2017) has won two titles, and ten other managers have each won the competition once. Ancelotti is the most recent manager to have won the FIFA Club World Cup, doing so with Real Madrid in the 2022 edition.

List of managers in the final

Brazilian, Spanish and German managers hold the joint-record for most consecutive appearances of winning coaches, with three back-to-back triumphs each; a Brazilian manager won the final in 2000, 2005 and 2006, a Spanish manager did so in 2009, 2010 and 2011, while a German manager accomplished the feat in 2019, 2020 and 2021. Spanish managers have won also won the most total finals, with five (the aforementioned three, plus in 2013 and 2015).

Rafael Benítez of Spain became the first manager to reach the FIFA Club World Cup final with a foreign club when English side Liverpool side lost the 2005 final under his leadership; he led other foreign clubs to the final on two further occasions, winning in 2010 with Italian side Internazionale and losing in 2012 with English team Chelsea. Sir Alex Ferguson, Pep Guardiola, Carlo Ancelotti, Zinedine Zidane, Santiago Solari, Jürgen Klopp and Thomas Tuchel are the other managers to win the final with a foreign club, with Ancelotti (2014 and 2022) and Zidane (2016 and 2017) the only ones to accomplish this on multiple occasions, all while managing Real Madrid.

Along with Ancelotti and Zidane, Guardiola is the only other manager to have led the same club to the final on more than one occasion, coming out victorious with Barcelona in 2009 and 2011. He also won the final in 2013 as coach of Bayern Munich, becoming the first manager to win the trophy three times. 

The inaugural final in 2000 remains the only one to see two managers from the same nation, with both hailing from Brazil.

Results by manager
Pep Guardiola and Carlo Ancelotti are the only managers to have won three FIFA Club World Cups; Guardiola won twice with Barcelona and once with Bayern Munich, while Ancelotti was victorious once with Milan and twice with Real Madrid. Rafael Benítez, alongside Ancelotti and Guardiola, holds the record for the most appearances in the final, leading English clubs Liverpool and Chelsea, as well as Italian club Internazionale, to one final each. Lamine N'Diaye of Senegal in 2010, Faouzi Benzarti of Tunisia in 2013 and Masatada Ishii of Japan in 2016 were the only non-European and non-South American managers to have appeared in the final. The aforementioned three managers, as well as Zoran Mamić in 2018, Ricardo Ferretti in 2020 and Ramón Díaz in 2022, are the only ones to have led a club outside Europe and South America into the decisive match.

Results by nationality
Spanish managers have had the most success in the competition, amassing five titles in seven total final appearances. Brazilian managers have won four titles, German and Italian managers have each won three, French managers have won two, and a Scottish manager has won the title once. Argentine managers hold the dubious record of the most losses in the final with six, including defeats in three consecutive editions; a manager from Argentina has only won the competition on one occasion.

Results by continent
European managers remain the most successful of the competition, with a total of thirteen titles. Their South American counterparts are second with five titles, while Africa has had two managers lead a club into the final, and Asia has had one.

See also
List of FIFA Club World Cup finals

References

External links
  
  

FIFA Club World Cup
FIFA Club World Cup